This is a complete list of school districts in the state of Wisconsin.

CESA 1

Kenosha County
Kenosha School District

Milwaukee County

Brown Deer School District
Cudahy School District
Fox Point J2 School District
Franklin Public School District
Glendale-River Hills School District
Greendale School District
Greenfield School District
Hamilton School District
Hartland-Lakeside J3 School District
Maple Dale-Indian Hill School District
Milwaukee School District
Nicolet Union High Sch District
Oak Creek-Franklin Joint School District
Saint Francis School District
Shorewood School District
South Milwaukee School District
Wauwatosa School District
West Allis-West Milwaukee School District
Whitefish Bay School District
Whitnall School District

Ozaukee County

Cedarburg School District
Grafton School District
Mequon-Thiensville School District
Northern Ozaukee School District
Port Washington-Saukville School District

Racine County
Racine Unified School District

Washington County
Germantown School District

Waukesha County

Arrowhead UHS School District
Elmbrook School District
Kettle Moraine School District
Lake Country School District
Menomonee Falls School District
Merton Community School District
Mukwonago School District
Muskego-Norway School District
New Berlin School District
Norris School District
North Lake School District
Oconomowoc Area School District
Pewaukee School District
Richmond School District
Stone Bank School District
Swallow School District
Waukesha School District

CESA 2

Dane County

Belleville School District
Cambridge School District
De Forest Area School District
Deerfield Community School District
Madison Metropolitan School District
Marshall School District
McFarland School District
Middleton-Cross Plains Area School District
Monona Grove School District
Mount Horeb Area School District
Oregon School District
Stoughton Area School District
Sun Prairie Area School District
Verona Area School District
Waunakee Community School District
Wisconsin Heights School District

Green County

Albany School District
Brodhead School District
Monroe School District
Monticello School District
New Glarus School District

Jefferson County

Fort Atkinson School District
Jefferson School District
Johnson Creek School District
Lake Mills Area School District
Palmyra-Eagle Area School District
Waterloo School District
Watertown Unified School District

Kenosha County

Brighton #1 School District
Bristol #1 School District
Central/Westosha UHS School District
Paris J1 School District
Salem School District
Silver Lake J1 School District
Trevor-Wilmot Consolidated School District
Twin Lakes #4 School District
Wheatland J1 School District
Wilmot UHS School District

Racine County

Burlington Area School District
Dover #1 School District
North Cape School District
Norway J7 School District
Randall J1 School District
Raymond #14 School District
Union Grove J1 School District
Union Grove UHS School District
Washington-Caldwell School District
Waterford Graded J1 School District
Waterford UHS School District
Yorkville J2 School District

Rock County

Beloit School District
Beloit Turner School District
Clinton Community School District
Edgerton School District
Evansville Community School District
Janesville School District
Milton School District
Parkview School District

Walworth County

Big Foot UHS School District
Delavan-Darien School District
East Troy Community School District
Elkhorn Area School District
Fontana J8 School District
Geneva J4 School District
Genoa City J2 School District
Lake Geneva J1 School District
Lake Geneva-Genoa City UHS School District
Linn J4 School District
Linn J6 School District
Sharon J11 School District
Walworth J1 School District
Whitewater Unified School District
Williams Bay School District

CESA 3

Crawford County

North Crawford School District
Prairie du Chien Area School District
Seneca Area School District
Wauzeka-Steuben School District

Grant County

Boscobel Area School District
Cassville School District
Cuba City School District
Fennimore Community School District
Lancaster Community School District
Platteville School District
Potosi School District
River Ridge School District
Riverdale School District
Southwestern Wisconsin School District

Iowa County

Barneveld School District
Dodgeville School District
Highland School District
Iowa-Grant School District
Mineral Point Unified School District

Lafayette County

Argyle School District
Belmont Community School District
Benton School District
Black Hawk School District
Darlington Community School District
Pecatonica Area School District
Shullsburg School District

Richland County

Ithaca School District
Richland School District

Sauk County

River Valley School District
Weston School District

Vernon County
Kickapoo Area School District

CESA 4

Buffalo County

Alma School District
Cochrane-Fountain City School District

Jackson County

Alma Center School District
Black River Falls School District
Melrose-Mindoro School District

Juneau County

Royall School District
Wonewoc-Union Center School District

La Crosse County

Bangor School District
Holmen School District
La Crosse School District
Onalaska School District
West Salem School District

Monroe County

Cashton School District
Norwalk-Ontario-Wilton School District
Sparta Area School District
Tomah Area School District

Trempealeau County

Arcadia School District
Blair-Taylor School District
Galesville-Ettrick-Trempealeau School District
Independence School District
Whitehall School District

Vernon County

De Soto Area School District
Hillsboro School District
La Farge School District
Viroqua Area School District
Westby Area School District

CESA 5

Adams County
Adams-Friendship Area School District

Columbia County

Cambria-Friesland School District
Columbus School District
Fall River School District
Lodi School District
Pardeeville Area School District
Portage Community School District
Poynette School District
Rio Community School District

Dodge County
Randolph School District

Green Lake County
Princeton School District

Juneau County

Mauston School District
Necedah Area School District
New Lisbon School District

Marquette County

Montello School District
Westfield School District

Portage County

Almond-Bancroft School District
Rosholt School District
Stevens Point Area Public School District
Tomorrow River School District

Sauk County

Baraboo School District
Reedsburg School District
Sauk Prairie School District
Wisconsin Dells School District

Waupaca County

Iola-Scandinavia School District
Waupaca School District
Wautoma Area School District

Waushara County

Tri-County Area School District
Wild Rose School District

Wood County

Auburndale School District
Marshfield Unified School District
Nekoosa School District
Pittsville School District
Port Edwards School District
Wisconsin Rapids School District

CESA 6

Dodge County

Beaver Dam Unified School District
Dodgeland School District
Herman-Neosho-Rubicon School District
Horicon School District
Hustisford School District
Lomira School District
Mayville School District

Fond du Lac County

Campbellsport School District
Fond du Lac School District
North Fond du Lac School District
Oakfield School District
Ripon Area School District
Rosendale-Brandon School District
Waupun School District

Green Lake County

Berlin Area School District
Green Lake School District
Markesan School District

Outagamie County

Appleton Area School District
Freedom Area School District
Hortonville Area School District
Kaukauna Area School District
Kimberly Area School District
Little Chute Area School District
Shiocton School District

Washington County

Erin School District
Hartford J1 School District
Hartford UHS School District
Holy Hill Area School District
Kewaskum School District
Slinger School District
West Bend School District

Waupaca County

Manawa School District
New London School District
Weyauwega-Fremont School District

Winnebago County

Menasha Joint School District
Neenah Joint School District
Omro School District
Oshkosh Area School District
Winneconne Community School District

CESA 7

Brown County

Ashwaubenon School District
De Pere School District
Denmark School District
Green Bay Area Public School District
Howard-Suamico School District
Pulaski Community School District
West De Pere School District
Wrightstown Community School District

Calumet County

Brillion School District
Chilton School District
Hilbert School District
New Holstein School District
Stockbridge School District

Door County

Gibraltar Area School District
Sevastopol School District
Southern Door County School District
Sturgeon Bay School District
Washington Island School District

Kewaunee County

Algoma School District
Kewaunee School District
Luxemburg-Casco School District

Manitowoc County

Kiel Area School District
Manitowoc School District
Mishicot School District
Reedsville School District
Two Rivers Public School District
Valders Area School District

Outagamie County
Seymour Community School District

Sheboygan County

Cedar Grove-Belgium Area School District
Elkhart Lake-Glenbeulah School District
Howards Grove School District
Kohler School District
Oostburg School District
Plymouth Joint School District
Random Lake School District
Sheboygan Area School District
Sheboygan Falls School District

CESA 8

Florence County
Florence County School District

Forest County

Crandon School District
Laona School District
Wabeno Area School District

Langlade County
White Lake School District

Marinette County

Beecher-Dunbar-Pembine School District
Coleman School District
Crivitz School District
Goodman-Armstrong Creek School District
Marinette School District
Niagara School District
Peshtigo School District
Wausaukee School District

Menominee County
Menominee Indian School District

Oconto County

Gillett School District
Lena School District
Oconto Unified School District
Oconto Falls Public School District
Suring Public School District

Shawano County

Bonduel School District
Bowler School District
Gresham School District
Shawano School District
Tigerton School District
Wittenberg-Birnamwood School District

Waupaca County

Clintonville School District
Marion School District

CESA 9

Langlade County

Antigo School District
Elcho School District

Lincoln County

Merrill Area School District
Tomahawk School District

Marathon County

Athens School District
D C Everest Area School District
Edgar School District
Marathon City School District
Mosinee School District
Stratford School District
Wausau School District

Oneida County

Lakeland UHS School District
Minocqua J1 School District
Rhinelander School District
Three Lakes School District

Price County
Prentice School District

Taylor County
Rib Lake School District

Vilas County

Lac du Flambeau #1 School District
North Lakeland School District
Northland Pines School District
Phelps School District
Woodruff J1 School District

CESA 10

Buffalo County

Gilmanton School District
Mondovi School District

Chippewa County

Bloomer School District
Cadott Community School District
Chippewa Falls Area Unified School District
Cornell School District
Lake Holcombe School District
New Auburn School District
Stanley-Boyd Area School District

Clark County

Abbotsford School District
Colby School District
Granton Area School District
Greenwood School District
Loyal School District
Neillsville School District
Owen-Withee School District
Thorp School District

Eau Claire County

Altoona School District
Augusta School District
Eau Claire Area School District
Fall Creek School District

Marathon County
Spencer School District

Rusk County

Bruce School District
Flambeau School District
Ladysmith School District

Taylor County

Gilman School District
Medford Area Public School District

Trempealeau County

Eleva-Strum School District
Osseo-Fairchild School District

CESA 11

Barron County

Barron Area School District
Cameron School District
Chetek-Weyerhaeuser Area School District
Cumberland School District
Prairie Farm Public School District
Rice Lake Area School District
Turtle Lake School District

Burnett County

Grantsburg School District
Siren School District
Webster School District

Dunn County

Boyceville Community School District
Colfax School District
Elk Mound Area School District
Menomonie Area School District

Pepin County

Durand-Arkansaw School District
Pepin Area School District

Pierce County

Ellsworth Community School District
Elmwood School District
Prescott School District
River Falls School District
Spring Valley School District

Polk County

Amery School District
Clayton School District
Clear Lake School District
Frederic School District
Luck School District
Osceola School District
Saint Croix Falls School District
Unity School District

Saint Croix County

Baldwin-Woodville Area School District
Glenwood City School District
Hudson School District
New Richmond School District
Saint Croix Central School District
Somerset School District

Washburn County

Birchwood School District
Shell Lake School District
Spooner School District

CESA 12

Ashland County

Ashland School District
Butternut School District
Mellen School District

Bayfield County

Bayfield School District
Drummond Area School District
South Shore School District
Washburn School District

Douglas County

Maple School District
Solon Springs School District
Superior School District

Iron County

Hurley School District
Mercer School District

Price County

Chequamegon School District
Phillips School District
Plum City School District

Sawyer County

Hayward Community School District
Winter School District

Washburn County
Northwood School District

External links
List of school districts from the Wisconsin Department of Public Instruction
List of school districts from GreatSchools.net

 
School districts
Wisconsin
School districts